Luka Vujanović (Cyrillic: Лука Вујановић; born 17 July 1994 in Cetinje) is a Montenegrin football midfielder who most recently played for Vojvodina.

Club career

Lovćen
Vujanović started his professional career in his local club Lovćen. Solid displays earned him a call to the U21 national team, for which he debuted in 2015.

Vojvodina
On 19 July 2017, Vujanović signed a four-year-deal with Serbian outfit Vojvodina. On 18 November 2017, Luka made his Serbian SuperLiga debut, appearing in 0:0 home draw against Radnik Surdulica.

Career statistics

Honours

Club
Lovćen
Montenegrin Cup (1): 2013–14

References

External links
 
 
 

Living people
1994 births
Sportspeople from Cetinje
Association football midfielders
Montenegrin footballers
Montenegro under-21 international footballers
FK Lovćen players
FK Vojvodina players
Montenegrin First League players
Serbian SuperLiga players
Montenegrin expatriate footballers
Expatriate footballers in Serbia
Montenegrin expatriate sportspeople in Serbia